The immunoglobulin light chain is the small polypeptide subunit of an antibody (immunoglobulin).

A typical antibody is composed of two immunoglobulin (Ig) heavy chains and two Ig light chains.

In humans
There are two types of light chain in humans: 
 kappa (κ) chain, encoded by the immunoglobulin kappa locus (IGK@) on chromosome 2 (locus: 2p11.2)
 lambda (λ) chain, encoded by the immunoglobulin lambda locus (IGL@) on chromosome 22 (locus: 22q11.2)

Antibodies are produced by B lymphocytes, each expressing only one class of light chain.   Once set, light chain class remains fixed for the life of the B lymphocyte. In a healthy individual, the total kappa-to-lambda ratio is roughly 2:1 in serum (measuring intact whole antibodies) or 1:1.5 if measuring free light chains, with a highly divergent ratio indicative of neoplasm. The free light chain ratio ranges from 0.26 to 1.65.  Both the kappa and the lambda chains can increase proportionately, maintaining a normal ratio.  This is usually indicative of something other than a blood cell dyscrasia, such as kidney disease.

In other animals
The immunoglobulin light chain genes in tetrapods can be classified into three distinct groups: kappa (κ), lambda (λ), and sigma (σ). The divergence of the κ, λ, and σ isotypes preceded the radiation of tetrapods. The σ isotype was lost after the evolution of the amphibian lineage and before the emergence of the reptilian lineage.

Other types of light chains can be found in lower vertebrates, such as the Ig-Light-Iota chain of Chondrichthyes and Teleostei.

Camelids are unique among mammals as they also have fully functional antibodies which have two heavy chains, but lack the light chains usually paired with each heavy chain.

Sharks also possess, as part of their adaptive immune systems, a functional heavy-chain homodimeric antibody-like molecule referred to as IgNAR (immunoglobulin new antigen receptor). IgNAR is believed to have never had an associated light chain, contrary to the understanding that the heavy-chain-only antibodies in camelids may have lost its light chain partner through evolution.

Structure
Only one type of light chain is present in a typical antibody, thus the two light chains of an individual antibody are identical.

Each light chain is composed of two tandem immunoglobulin domains:
 one constant (CL) domain  
 one variable domain (VL) that is important for binding antigen

The approximate length of a light chain protein is from 211 to 217 amino acids.  The constant region determines what class (kappa or lambda) the light chain is.  The lambda class has 4 subtypes (1, 2, 3, and 7).

In pathology
Individual B-cells in lymphoid tissue possess either kappa or lambda light chains, but never both together.
Using immunohistochemistry, it is possible to determine the relative abundance of B-cells expressing kappa and lambda light chains. If the lymph node or similar tissue is reactive, or otherwise benign, it should possess a mixture of kappa positive and lambda positive cells. If, however, one type of light chain is significantly more common than the other, the cells are likely all derived from a small clonal population, which may indicate a malignant condition, such as B-cell lymphoma.

Free immunoglobulin light chains secreted by neoplastic plasma cells, such as in multiple myeloma, can be called Bence Jones protein when detected in the urine, although there is a trend to refer to these as urinary free light chains.

Increased levels of free Ig light chains have also been detected in various inflammatory diseases. It is important to note that, in contrast to increased levels in lymphoma patients, these Ig light chains are polyclonal. Recent studies have shown that these Ig light chains can bind to mast cells and, using their ability to bind antigen, facilitate activation of these mast cells.  Activation of mast cells results in the release of various pro-inflammatory mediators which are believed to contribute to the development of the inflammatory disease. Recent studies have shown that Ig light chains not only activate mast cells but also dorsal root ganglia and neutrophils, expanding their possible role as mediators in inflammatory disease.

See also
 Monoclonal antibody

References

External links
 
 Educational Resource for Immunoglobulin Light Chains

Immune system